The Athletics Federation of the Dominican Republic (FDAA; Federación Dominicana de Asociaciones de Atletismo) is the governing body for the sport of athletics in Dominican Republic.  The current president is Gerardo Suero Correa.  He was elected in November 2010 for the period 2010-2014.

History
FDAA was founded on March 21, 1953 and was affiliated to the IAAF on December 18, 1953.

Presidents
Starting with the foundation of FDAA in 1953, there were about nine presidents.

Affiliations
FDAA is the national member federation for Dominican Republic in the following international organisations:
International Association of Athletics Federations (IAAF)
North American, Central American and Caribbean Athletic Association (NACAC)
Association of Panamerican Athletics (APA)
Asociación Iberoamericana de Atletismo (AIA; Ibero-American Athletics Association)
Central American and Caribbean Athletic Confederation (CACAC)
Moreover, it is part of the following national organisations:
Dominican Republic Olympic Committee (COLIMDO; Comité Olímpico Dominicano)

National records
FDAA maintains the Dominican records in athletics.

External links
Official Webpage (in Spanish)

References

Dominican Republic
Athletics in the Dominican Republic
Athletics
1953 establishments in the Dominican Republic
Sports organizations established in 1953
National governing bodies for athletics